Bekhta Rabah-Mazari (born ) is an Algerian female volleyball player. She is part of the Algeria women's national volleyball team.

She participated in the 2015 FIVB Volleyball World Grand Prix.
On club level she played for NR Chlef in 2015.

References

1998 births
Living people
Algerian women's volleyball players
Place of birth missing (living people)
21st-century Algerian women
20th-century Algerian women